McClafferty is a surname. Notable people with the surname include:

Carla Killough McClafferty (born 1958), American writer
Edith McClafferty (born 1960), American politician
Mark McClafferty, American film and television producer

See also
McCafferty (surname)